Anna Zugno (born 30 April 1984) is a road cyclist from Italy. She represented her nation at the 2003, 2004, 2005, 2007 and 2008 UCI Road World Championships.

References

External links
 profile at Procyclingstats.com

1984 births
Italian female cyclists
Living people
Place of birth missing (living people)
Cyclists from the Province of Brescia